The following is a timeline of the history of the city of Sacramento, California, United States.

19th century

 1839 – Sutter's Fort (or “New Helvetia”) established.
 1845 – New Helvetia Cemetery established, the first cemetery in the city
 1849
 Sacramento City founded by John Sutter, Jr. and Sam Brannan.
 William Stout becomes mayor.
 City Cemetery established.
 First sale of town lots.
 1850
 August: Squatters' Riot.
 October–November: Cholera outbreak
 November: Chevra Kaddisha Cemetery established, the first Jewish cemetery in the state
 Population: 6,820.
 Daily California Republican newspaper begins publication.
 1852
 Congregation B'nai Israel synagogue established.
 Big Four Building constructed.
 Fire.
 1854 – State legislature relocates to Sacramento.
 1855
 First local steam railway of California opened.
 November: the first California State Convention of Colored Citizens, a colored convention, was held here.
 1856
 Leland Stanford Mansion State Historic Park built.
 December: the second California State Convention of Colored Citizens, a colored convention, held here
 1857 
 Daily Bee newspaper begins publication.
 Sacramento Library Association founded.
 1860 – Ground broken for California State Capitol building.
 1862 - Flood.
 1863 – Central Pacific Railroad building across the Sierras begins.
 1865 – California State Convention of Colored Citizens, a colored convention, was held here
 1869 – First train from the Atlantic coast reaches Sacramento.
 1874 – Capitol building completed.
 1877 – Muybridge photographs galloping horse at Union Park Racetrack.
 1879 – Sacramento Free Public Library founded.
 1889 – Cathedral of the Blessed Sacrament built.
 1890 – Population: 26,386.
 1891 – Brighton School rebuilt.
 1898 – Ruhstaller Building constructed.
 1900  – Population: 29,282.

20th century

 1910 – Population: 44,696.
 1912  
 Empress Theatre opens.
 New Helvetia Cemetery closes for burials
 1915 – Zoological park established.
 1919 – Business and Professional Women's Club founded.
 1923 – Sacramento Municipal Utility District established.
 1924 
 Senator Hotel in business.
 Chevra Kaddisha Cemetery closes
 Home of Peace Cemetery opens
 1927
 Westminster Presbyterian Church built.
 William Land Park Zoo opens.
 1931 – Blue Anchor Building constructed.
 1933 – Federal Building constructed.
 1935
 Tower Bridge opens.
 McClellan Air Force Base established near city.
1937 - Sacramento Sheriff's Posse organized.
 1937 – Sacramento Movie Forum organized.
 1939 – Sacred Heart Parish School constructed.
 1941 – Sacramento Army Depot activated.
1942 - Sacramento Horsemen's Association organized.
 1947
 Sacramento Opera Guild founded.
 Vic's Ice Cream in business.
 1948
Sacramento Symphony formed.
Belle Cooledge elected mayor.
 1954 – Sacramento Ballet founded.
 1955 – KCRA-TV begins broadcasting.
 1956 – Sacramento Youth Symphony founded.
 1957 – Arden Fair Mall in business.
 1959 - KVIE-TV begins broadcasting.
 1960 – Tower Records in business.
 1961
 Sacramento Peace Center established.
 Sacramento Book Collectors Club active.
 1962 – The Sacramento Observer newspaper begins publication.
 1966 – From March to April, farmworkers march to Sacramento from Delano.
 1968 – Sacramento Traditional Jazz Society formed.
 1974 – Sacramento Dixieland Jubilee first held.
 1975
 Phil Isenberg becomes mayor.
 September 5: Gerald Ford assassination attempt.
 1977 – Sacramento Metropolitan Arts Commission established.
 1979
 November 28: Anti-nuclear sit-in at State Capitol.
 Local Government Commission headquartered in city.
 1982 – California State Capitol building restored.
 1983 – Anne Rudin becomes mayor.
 1985
 Sacramento Kings basketball team active.
 Sacramento History Center established.
 1989 – Renaissance Tower built.
 1990 – Population: 369,365.
 1991
 April 4: 1991 Sacramento hostage crisis.
 U.S. Bank Plaza built.
 1992 – Wells Fargo Center built.
 1993 – Joe Serna, Jr. becomes mayor.
 1995
 City website online.
 Sacramento Festival of Cinema begins.
 1996 – Thistle Dew Dessert Theatre founded.
 1997 – Sacramento Philharmonic Orchestra established.
 1998 – Al-Arqam Islamic School established.
 1999 – Robert T. Matsui United States Courthouse and Esquire Tower built.
 2000
 Sacramento Film and Music Festival begins.
 Heather Fargo becomes mayor.

21st century
 2008
 Kevin Johnson becomes mayor.
 Sacramento Press and Natomas Buzz begin publication.
 U.S. Bank Tower built.
 2009 – Bank of the West Tower built.
 2010 – Population: 466,488.
 2014 – Golden 1 Center breaks ground as the new home of the Sacramento Kings and opens in 2016.
 2016 – Darrell Steinberg becomes mayor.
 2022 – A mass shooting occurs in downtown Sacramento, killing six and injuring twelve.

See also
 History of Sacramento, California
 List of mayors of Sacramento, California
 California Historical Landmarks in Sacramento County, California
 National Register of Historic Places listings in Sacramento County, California
 Timelines of other cities in the Northern California area of California: Fresno, Mountain View, Oakland, San Francisco, San Jose

References

Bibliography

 
 
 
 1919 ed.

External links

 
 Items related to Sacramento, various dates (via Digital Public Library of America)

 
sacramento